Michel Sadelain is an immunologist and genetic engineer at Memorial Sloan Kettering Cancer Center, New York, New York, where he holds the Steve and Barbara Friedman Chair. He is the founding director of the Center for Cell Engineering and the head of the Gene Transfer and Gene Expression Laboratory. He is a member of the department of medicine at Memorial Hospital and of the immunology program at the Sloan Kettering Institute. He is best known for his major contributions to T cell engineering and chimeric antigen receptor (CAR) therapy, an immunotherapy based on the genetic engineering of a patient's own T cells to treat cancer.

Education and career 
Sadelain was born in France, where he earned his MD at the University of Paris, France, in 1984. After obtaining his PhD in immunology at the University of Alberta in Edmonton, Canada, in 1989, he trained as a postdoctoral fellow at the Whitehead Institute for Biomedical Research, Massachusetts Institute of Technology (MIT) in Cambridge, Massachusetts. While at MIT, Sadelain began his research on genetic engineering. In 1994, Sadelain joined Memorial Sloan Kettering as an assistant member in the Sloan Kettering Institute, where he established programs on human hematopoietic stem cell and T cell engineering. In 2008, he founded the Center for Cell Engineering at Memorial Sloan Kettering. He is a past president of the American Society of Cell and Gene Therapy (2014–2015) and previously served on its board of directors from 2004 to 2007. He served as a member of the Recombinant DNA Advisory Committee (RAC) of the NIH from 2013 to 2015.

Research 
Sadelain and his team study gene transfer in hematopoietic stem cells and T cells, the regulation of transgene expression, the biology of chimeric antigen receptors, and therapeutic strategies to enhance immunity against cancer.
Sadelain is a recognized leader in the conceptualization and design of synthetic receptors for antigen, which he named chimeric antigen receptors (CARs). T cells can be engineered to express a CAR to acquire the ability to recognize and destroy cancer cells. Sadelain has referred to CAR T cells as a “living drug.”  A CAR typically comprises an antibody fragment (scFv) to recognize the cancer and a modular signaling domain to activate the T cell and promote T cell multiplication and persistence. CAR T cells are made by extracting a cancer patient’s T cells, inserting a CAR into the cell using a vector such as a gamma-retroviral or lentiviral vector, and then re-infusing the cells. Sadelain's current research makes use of genome editing, which he showed enhances CAR T cells when the CAR is expressed from the TRAC locus.
 
Sadelain’s laboratory designed second generation CARs, which are endowed with both activating and costimulatory properties, which is integral to the success of CAR therapies. In 2003, Sadelain's lab identified CD19 as a target for CAR therapy in mice. Following the establishment of clinical CAR T cell manufacturing by Dr. Isabelle Rivière at MSK, Sadelain's team was the first to report on molecular complete responses induced by CD19 CAR T cells in adults with relapsed, refractory acute lymphoblastic leukemia. The MSK team received FDA breakthrough designation for this treatment in 2014. The US FDA approved the first CAR therapies, targeting CD19 with second generations CARs, in 2017.
 
Sadelain's research on “off-the-shelf” CAR T cells derived from induced pluripotent stem cells (iPSCs) is now being developed in a collaboration with Fate Therapeutics. His research with Dr. Prasad S. Adusumilli led to a collaboration with Atara Biotherapeutics, Inc. for a product candidate to treat malignant mesothelioma using mesothelin-targeted CAR T cells named icasM28z. In 2013, Sadelain co-founded Juno Therapeutics Inc.

Sadelain also designed lentiviral vectors encoding the β-globin gene for the treatment of severe hemoglobinopathies, which include β-thalassemia and sickle cell disease. The MSK team was the first to treat patients with β-thalassemia in the US. The history of the field and Sadelain’s contributions are narrated in the 2021 George Stamatoyannopoulos Memorial Lecture at the annual meeting of the American Society of Gene and Cell Therapy.

Patents 
Sadelain holds 13 patents in immunotherapy. Sadelain is a named inventor on U.S. Patent No. 7446190B2 covering nucleic acids encoding chimeric T cell receptors. Sadelain is also named on patent U.S. Patent No. 10,370,452 covering compositions and uses of effector T cells expressing a chimeric antigen receptor (CAR), where such T cells are derived from a pluripotent stem cell including an induced pluripotent stem cell (iPSC). The patent is licensed for off-the-shelf, T-cell receptor (TCR)-less CD19 chimeric antigen receptor (CAR) T-cell product candidate known as FT819.

Significant publications 
 1998- Krause, Anja; Guo, Hong-Fen; Latouche, Jean-Baptiste; Tan, Cuiwen; Cheung, Nai-Kong V.; Sadelain, Michel (1998-08-17). "Antigen-dependent CD28 Signaling Selectively Enhances Survival and Proliferation in Genetically Modified Activated Human Primary T Lymphocytes" doi 10.1084/jem.188.4.619 ISSN0022-1007 PMID9705944
 2000- Chad May, Stefano Rivella, John Callegari, Glenn Heller, Karen M. L. Gaensler, Lucio Luzzatto & Michel Sadelain Therapeutic haemoglobin synthesis in β-thalassaemic mice expressing lentivirus-encoded human β-globin, Nature 406, 82–86 (2000). 
 2002- Maher, John; Brentjens, Renier J.; Gunset, Gertrude; Rivière, Isabelle; Sadelain, Michel Nat Biotechnol 20, 70–75 (2002). "Human T-lymphocyte cytotoxicity and proliferation directed by a single chimeric TCRζ /CD28 receptor"doi10.1038/nbt0102-70ISSN1546-1696
 2003- Brentjens, Renier J.; Latouche, Jean-Baptiste; Santos, Elmer; Marti, Francesc; Gong, Michael C.; Lyddane, Clay; King, Philip D.; Larson, Steven; Weiss, Mark; Rivière, Isabelle; Sadelain, Michel (2003–03). "Eradication of systemic B-cell tumors by genetically targeted human T lymphocytes co-stimulated by CD80 and interleukin-15"doi10.1038/nm827ISSN1546-170X
 2009- Hollyman, Daniel; Stefanski, Jolanta; Przybylowski, Mark; Bartido, Shirley; Borquez-Ojeda, Oriana; Taylor, Clare; Yeh, Raymond; Capacio, Vanessa; Olszewska, Malgorzata; Hosey, James; Sadelain, Michel, Riviere, Isabelle (2009). "Manufacturing validation of biologically functional T cells targeted to CD19 antigen for autologous adoptive cell therapy" doi10.1097/CJI.0b013e318194a6e8 ISSN 1524-9557 PMC2683970 PMID 19238016
 2011- Renier J. Brentjens, Isabelle Rivière, Jae H. Park, Marco L. Davila, Xiuyan Wang, Jolanta Stefanski, Clare Taylor, Raymond Yeh, Shirley Bartido, Oriana Borquez-Ojeda, Malgorzata Olszewska, Yvette Bernal, Hollie Pegram, Mark Przybylowski, Daniel Hollyman, Yelena Usachenko, Domenick Pirraglia, James Hosey, Elmer Santos, Elizabeth Halton, Peter Maslak, David Scheinberg, Joseph Jurcic, Mark Heaney, Glenn Heller, Mark Frattini, Michel Sadelain "Safety and persistence of adoptively transferred autologous CD19-targeted T cells in patients with relapsed or chemotherapy refractory B-cell leukemias" doi10.1182/blood-2011-04-348540ISSN0006-4971
 2013- Brentjens, Renier J.; Davila, Marco L.; Riviere, Isabelle; Park, Jae; Wang, Xiuyan; Cowell, Lindsay G.; Bartido, Shirley; Stefanski, Jolanta; Taylor, Clare; Olszewska, Malgorzata; Borquez-Ojeda, Oriana (2013-03-20). "CD19-Targeted T Cells Rapidly Induce Molecular Remissions in Adults with Chemotherapy-Refractory Acute Lymphoblastic Leukemia" doi10.1126/scitranslmed.3005930ISSN 1946-6234 
 2013- Themeli M, Kloss C, Ciriello G, Fedorov VD, Perna F, Gonen M, Sadelain M. "Generation of functional tumor-targeted T lymphocytes from human chimeric antigen receptor- engineered induced pluripotent stem cells." Nature Biotechnology. 2013;31(10):928-33.
 2014- Davila, Marco L.; Riviere, Isabelle; Wang, Xiuyan; Bartido, Shirley; Park, Jae; Curran, Kevin; Chung, Stephen S.; Stefanski, Jolanta; Borquez-Ojeda, Oriana; Olszewska, Malgorzata; Qu, Jinrong (2014-02-19). "Efficacy and Toxicity Management of 19-28z CAR T Cell Therapy in B Cell Acute Lymphoblastic Leukemia" doi10.1126/scitranslmed.3008226 ISSN 1946-6234 PMID24553386
 2017- Eyquem, Justin; Mansilla-Soto, Jorge; Giavridis, Theodoros; van der Stegen, Sjoukje J. C.; Hamieh, Mohamad; Cunanan, Kristen M.; Odak, Ashlesha; Gönen, Mithat; Sadelain, Michel (2017–03). "Targeting a CAR to the TRAC locus with CRISPR/Cas9 enhances tumour rejection" Nature. 543 (7643): 113–117. doi:10.1038/nature21405. ISSN 1476-4687.
 2018- Park, Jae H.; Rivière, Isabelle; Gonen, Mithat; Wang, Xiuyan; Sénéchal, Brigitte; Curran, Kevin J.; Sauter, Craig; Wang, Yongzeng; Santomasso, Bianca; Mead, Elena; Roshal, Mikhail (2018-02-01). "Long-Term Follow-up of CD19 CAR Therapy in Acute Lymphoblastic Leukemia". New England Journal of Medicine. 378 (5): 449–459. doi:10.1056/NEJMoa1709919. ISSN 0028-4793. PMC 6637939. .
 2018- Dunbar, Cynthia E.; High, Katherine A.; Joung, J. Keith; Kohn, Donald B.; Ozawa, Keiya; Sadelain, Michel (2018-01-12). "Gene therapy comes of age". Science. 359 (6372): eaan4672. doi:10.1126/science.aan4672. ISSN 0036-8075. .

Memberships 
 CRI Accelerator Leadership
 The American Society for Clinical Investigation
 American Association for Cancer Research (AACR)
 American Society for Clinical Investigation (ASCI)
 American Society of Gene and Cell Therapy (ASGCT)
 American Society of Hematology (ASH)

Awards 
 2012 William B. Coley Award.
 2013 Sultan Bin Khalifa International Thalassemia Award
 2017 Passano Laureate and Physician Scientist Award
 2018 Pasteur-Servier-Weizmann Prize Laureate.
 2019  Jacob and Louise Gabbay Award in Biotechnology and Medicine
 2019 INSERM International Prize
 2020 Leopold Griffuel Award
 2021 ASGCT Outstanding Achievement Award

References

External links 
 
 
 
    
 
 

American medical researchers
American immunologists